Tarlac Montessori School (commonly referred to as TMS or Monté) is a private catholic school established in Tarlac City, Philippines in 1987. It is named after the physician and educator Maria Montessori.

Tarlac Montessori School offers co-educational kindergarten, elementary, junior high school, and senior high school programs. TMS offers a Special Science Class (SSC) for grades 1–12.

TMS undergraduates follow a Catholic-rooted curriculum throughout their programs and hosts Wednesday Novenas and First Friday Mass in the mornings that they are scheduled. TMS also celebrates Catholic holidays and the feast days of saints.

Tarlac Montessori School was and still is managed by its directress Dr. Elizabeth T. Asiaten and her husband, Tarlac Board Member Danilo Canlas Asiaten.

History

Tarlac Montessori School was established in 1987 at its first site at Masagana Building, F. Tañedo Street with its initial enrollees of 30 pupils in Nursery and Kindergarten. After a year, the number of enrollees doubled. In 1989 the school transferred to M.H. del Pilar Street with 180 enrollees and Grade One level was added. That same year, TMS held the first Stepping Up Ceremonies.

The next year, TMS opened the San Sebastian extension building to address the growing population of the school. In 1991, the San Sebastian building expanded having another wing; the school added a grade three level with a total of 328 enrollees. It was in the same year that the government granted recognition for its preschool department.

A year after, the San Sebastian extension building expanded into a two-storey building for it added the grade four level with a total of 394 enrollees.

In 1993, TMS joined for the first time the TAPSA Academic, Literary and Musical Competitions where they won second place with only grade four and grade five contestants.

To accommodate the rapid growth of the population, TMS constructed a new school building at a two-hectare lot in La Puerta Del Sol Hi-Land Subdivision in 1995. It was in the same year that it had the first grade school commencement exercise with 21 graduates.

It was in 1996 that the new school building was inaugurated, opening the High School Department with 38 first year students and 13 second year students. The total school population then was 755 and the first PTC was organized; in the same year TMS produced their official magazine called “The HARK”.

In 1998, TMS hosted TAPSA and became the Overall Champion in the elementary level, which coincided with the establishment of the TMS Boy Scout Movement, and the Student Council.

In 2005, the school was granted Government Recognition No. 05, s. 2011 to offer the Special Science Curriculum in the First Year level.

In 2012, TMS celebrated its 25th anniversary as an educational institution. In 2015, the school was granted permission to offer the Special Science Curriculum for Grade One.

In 2016, the K to 12 Senior High School Grade 11 was implemented under the Government Permit SHSP No. 178, s. 2015.  Additional six classrooms on the right wing of the building were constructed.

The school is currently applying for ISO 9001:2015 certification.

Academics

Programs 
Tarlac Montessori School offers programs at the kindergarten, elementary, and secondary levels.  The secondary level comprises junior high school and senior high school. Its academic offerings include the Basic Education Curriculum (BEC) and the Special Science Curriculum (SSC) at the elementary and junior high school levels. An incoming Grade 1 student can take a test and be offered and SSC section. A person in the SSC must maintain a grade of 85 or higher for major subjects (English, Math, and Science) and a grade of 83 or higher for minor subjects. All incoming students will also take the test again in Grade 7, including those previously in the curriculum in Grade 6.

In 2016, TMS opened its senior high school (Grades 11 and 12) program with the following strands: Accountancy, Business and Management (ABM), Humanities and Social Sciences (HUMSS), and Science, Technology, Engineering and Math (STEM).

Student organizations 
There are 8 accredited student organizations in Tarlac Montessori School. These are the Common Denominators' Guild (also referred to as the Math Club), Supreme Student Government (commonly abbreviated as SSG), Debate Society, TMS Music Ensemble, Art Jammers Guild, Eco-Warriors Club, The Hark (the official publication of the institution), Technology Club, and the Tarlac Montessori School Scouting Movement.

References

Catholic elementary schools in the Philippines
Educational institutions established in 1987
Schools in Tarlac
Catholic secondary schools in the Philippines
High schools in Tarlac
Education in Tarlac City
1987 establishments in the Philippines